Lübke is a surname. Notable people with the surname include:

 Andreas Lübke (born 1967), German football forward
 Heinrich Lübke (1892–1972), West German politician
 Ralf Lübke (born 1965), German athlete
 Wilhelm Lübke (1826–1893), German art historian
 Wilhelm Meyer-Lübke (1861–1936), Swiss philologist
 Wilhelmine Lübke, (1885–1981), wife of President Heinrich Lübke

See also
 Frederick C. Luebke (born 1927), American historian